Natomas/Sacramento Airport is a planned train station that will be a stop on Altamont Corridor Express and Amtrak California's San Joaquin services. The station site is in the Natomas area, north of Sacramento, east of Blacktop Road and immediately south of West Elkhorn Boulevard. Planned as the northern terminus of the Valley Rail project, it was expected to open no later than 2023. By 2023, then opening date had slipped to 2026. A shuttle bus will provide connectivity for those traveling between the station and Sacramento International Airport,  to the east.

References

Railway stations in Sacramento County, California
Future Amtrak stations in the United States
Railway stations scheduled to open in 2026
Future Altamont Corridor Express stations